Héctor Cazenave (13 April 1914 in Montevideo – 27 September 1958) was a French footballer. He played for Peñarol, Defensor Sporting Club and FC Sochaux-Montbéliard. Born in Uruguay, Cazenave represented the France national football team.

International career
Born in Uruguay to French parents, Cazenave earned 8 caps for the France national football team, and played in the 1938 FIFA World Cup.

References

External links
 
 
 

1914 births
1958 deaths
Footballers from Montevideo
French footballers
France international footballers
Uruguayan footballers
Uruguayan people of French descent
Uruguayan emigrants to France
Defensor Sporting players
FC Sochaux-Montbéliard players
Uruguayan Primera División players
Ligue 1 players
1938 FIFA World Cup players
Association football defenders